The 1893 FA Cup final was a football game contested by Wolverhampton Wanderers and Everton. Wolves won by a single goal, scored by Harry Allen.

This was the only time the final was staged at Fallowfield Stadium. Although the official attendance was 45,000, it is estimated that close to 60,000 spectators were actually in the ground. The overcrowding delayed the kick off and meant the pitch was often encroached upon during the game. Play was impeded so much that Everton, beaten 0–1, unsuccessfully demanded a replay afterwards, arguing the environment was not fit for a competitive match.

Everton had come into the match as favourites. Only a week earlier, they had sent their reserves to face Wolves in a league match to allow their first team time to rest before their semi-final replay. The reserves beat Wolves' Cup final team 4–2 at Molineux, boosting Everton's confidence.

Route to the Final

Match summary

Everton dominated the first half but saw their wingers hindered by the stray feet of the encroaching spectators on the touchline. To counteract this obstruction, both sides began to resort to a long ball game through the centre of the field. This tactic failed to provide any goals in the opening 45 minutes.

As the second half progressed, Everton began to tire, perhaps feeling the effects of 4 games in 10 days. On the hour mark, Wolves captain Harry Allen launched a hopeful lob from distance, which was misjudged by Williams and allowed to bounce into the net. Everton complained that the crowd had impeded their attempts to clear the ball, thus presenting Allen with the opportunity in the first place.

At the final whistle, the crowd invaded the pitch to mob the victorious Wolves players who had claimed their club's first ever FA Cup triumph.

Match details

External links
Match report

1893
Fa Cup Final
Fa Cup Final 1893
Fa Cup Final 1893
Sports competitions in Manchester
19th century in Manchester
March 1893 sports events